The following is a list of Taeniophyllum species accepted by the World Checklist of Selected Plant Families at December 2018.

 Taeniophyllum acsmithii Kocyan & Schuit. (2014)
 Taeniophyllum acuminatum (Schltr.) Kocyan & Schuit. (2014)
 Taeniophyllum affine Schltr. (1911)
 Taeniophyllum aggregatum Schltr. (1911)
 Taeniophyllum alatum (Ridl.) Kocyan & Schuit. (2014)
 Taeniophyllum album Schltr. (1913)
 Taeniophyllum alwisii Lindl. (1858)
 Taeniophyllum amboinense J.J.Sm. (1920)
 Taeniophyllum amplebracteatum Kocyan & Schuit. (2014)
 Taeniophyllum andamanicum N.P.Balakr. & N.Bhargava (1978 publ. 1979)
 Taeniophyllum annuliferum Carr (1932)
 Taeniophyllum antennatum Schuit. & de Vogel (2009)
 Taeniophyllum apiculatum J.J.Sm. (1935)
 Taeniophyllum arachnites J.J.Sm. (1908)
 Taeniophyllum arunachalense A.N.Rao & J.Lal (1991)
 Taeniophyllum asperatum Schltr. (1913)
 Taeniophyllum aurantiacum J.J.Sm. (1918)
 Taeniophyllum aureum Schltr. (1913)
 Taeniophyllum bakhuizenii J.J.Sm. (1918)
 Taeniophyllum bicostulatum J.J.Sm. (1928)
 Taeniophyllum biloculare J.J.Sm. (1913)
 Taeniophyllum biocellatum J.J.Sm. (1913)
 Taeniophyllum borneense Schltr. (1906)
 Taeniophyllum brachyceras (Schltr.) Kocyan & Schuit. (2014)
 Taeniophyllum brachypus Schltr. (1913)
 Taeniophyllum bracteatum L.O.Williams (1938)
 Taeniophyllum breviscapum J.J.Sm. (1910)
 Taeniophyllum brunnescens Schltr. (1913)
 Taeniophyllum bryoides (Schltr.) Kocyan & Schuit. (2014)
 Taeniophyllum calcaratum J.J.Sm. (1900)
 Taeniophyllum calceolus Carr (1932)
 Taeniophyllum calyptrochilum J.J.Sm. (1927)
 Taeniophyllum calyptrogyne Ormerod (2011)
 Taeniophyllum campanulatum Carr (1932)
 Taeniophyllum canaliculatum J.J.Sm. (1929)
 Taeniophyllum capillare J.J.Sm. (1933)
 Taeniophyllum cardiophorum Schltr. (1913)
 Taeniophyllum carinatum (Schltr.) Kocyan & Schuit. (2014)
 Taeniophyllum carnosiflorum Schltr. (1913)
 Taeniophyllum celebicum Rolfe (1899)
 Taeniophyllum ceratostylis (Schltr.) Kocyan & Schuit. (2014)
 Taeniophyllum chaetophorum (Schltr.) Kocyan & Schuit. (2014)
 Taeniophyllum clavatum Schltr. (1913)
 Taeniophyllum clavicalcar J.J.Sm. (1915)
 Taeniophyllum clavicalcaratum (J.J.Sm.) Kocyan & Schuit. (2014)
 Taeniophyllum clementsii (D.L.Jones & B.Gray) Kocyan & Schuit. (2014)
 Taeniophyllum cochleare Schltr. (1913)
 Taeniophyllum coiloglossum Schltr. (1913)
 Taeniophyllum collinum (Schltr.) Kocyan & Schuit. (2014)
 Taeniophyllum compactum Ames (1908)
 Taeniophyllum complanatum Fukuy. (1935)
 Taeniophyllum concavum Schltr. (1913)
 Taeniophyllum confertum B.Gray & D.L.Jones (1985)
 Taeniophyllum confusum Kores & L.Jonss. (1989)
 Taeniophyllum conoceras Schltr. (1913)
 Taeniophyllum copelandii Ames (1913 publ. 1914)
 Taeniophyllum coxii (Summerh.) Summerh. (1958)
 Taeniophyllum crenatum J.J.Sm. (1908)
 Taeniophyllum crepidiforme (King & Pantl.) King & Pantl. (1898)
 Taeniophyllum cucullatum Schltr. (1913)
 Taeniophyllum cycloglossum Schltr. (1913)
 Taeniophyllum cylindrocentrum Schltr. (1913)
 Taeniophyllum cymboglossum J.J.Sm. (1929)
 Taeniophyllum daroussinii Tixier & Guillaumin (1964)
 Taeniophyllum dentilobum J.J.Sm., (1935)
 Taeniophyllum dischorense Schltr. (1913)
 Taeniophyllum djampangense J.J.Sm. (1913)
 Taeniophyllum doctersii J.J.Sm. (1921)
 Taeniophyllum elegantissimum Rchb.f. (1878)
 Taeniophyllum elmeri Ames (1912)
 Taeniophyllum engae J.J.Wood (1981)
 Taeniophyllum epacridicola B.Gray (2015)
 Taeniophyllum erinaceum Ridl. (1916)
 Taeniophyllum erosulum (J.J.Sm.) Kocyan & Schuit. (2014)
 Taeniophyllum esetiferum J.J.Sm. (1931)
 Taeniophyllum excavatum J.J.Sm. (1908)
 Taeniophyllum exotrachys Schltr. (1913)
 Taeniophyllum explanatum B.Gray (2015)
 Taeniophyllum fasciculatum Aver. (1988)
 Taeniophyllum fasciola (G.Forst.) Seem. (1862)
 Taeniophyllum ferox Schltr. (1913)
 Taeniophyllum ficicola Schltr. (1911)
 Taeniophyllum filiforme J.J.Sm. (1900)
 Taeniophyllum fimbriatum J.J.Sm. (1908)
 Taeniophyllum finisterrae (Schltr.) Kocyan & Schuit. (2014)
 Taeniophyllum flaccidum (Schltr.) Kocyan & Schuit. (2014)
 Taeniophyllum foliatum Schltr. (1913)
 Taeniophyllum fragrans Schltr. (1913)
 Taeniophyllum gilimalense Jayaw. (1963)
 Taeniophyllum giriwoense J.J.Sm. (1914)
 Taeniophyllum glandulosum Blume (1825)
 Taeniophyllum govidjoae (Schltr.) Kocyan & Schuit. (2014)
 Taeniophyllum gracile (Rolfe) Garay (1972)
 Taeniophyllum gracillimum Schltr. (1906)
 Taeniophyllum grandiflorum Schltr. in K.M.Schumann & C.A.G.Lauterbach (1905)
 Taeniophyllum graptolitum N.Hallé (1977)
 Taeniophyllum hasseltii Rchb.f. (1863)
 Taeniophyllum hirtum Blume (1825)
 Taeniophyllum hosokawae (Fukuy.) L.O.Williams (1939)
 Taeniophyllum hygrophilum Schltr. (1913)
 Taeniophyllum iboense Schltr. (1913)
 Taeniophyllum iboetii (J.J.Sm.) Kocyan & Schuit. (2014)
 Taeniophyllum inconspicuum Schltr. (1911)
 Taeniophyllum insulare Seidenf. (1988)
 Taeniophyllum intermedium Carr (1932)
 Taeniophyllum jacobsonii J.J.Sm. (1928)
 Taeniophyllum jadunae Schltr. (1913)
 Taeniophyllum javanicum (J.J.Sm.) Kocyan & Schuit. (2014)
 Taeniophyllum jensenianum J.J.Sm. (1941)
 Taeniophyllum kaniense Schltr. (1913)
 Taeniophyllum kapahense Carr (1935)
 Taeniophyllum kenejianum Schltr. (1913)
 Taeniophyllum keysseri Mansf. (1929)
 Taeniophyllum kompsopus Schltr. in K.M.Schumann & C.A.G.Lauterbach (1905)
 Taeniophyllum labatii (M.Pignal & Munzinger) J.M.H.Shaw (2017)
 Taeniophyllum lamii (J.J.Sm.) Kocyan & Schuit. (2014)
 Taeniophyllum lamprorhizum Schltr. (1913)
 Taeniophyllum latipetalum Schltr. (1913)
 Taeniophyllum laxum (Schltr.) Kocyan & Schuit. (2014)
 Taeniophyllum ledermannii Schltr. (1923)
 Taeniophyllum leeuwenii Kocyan & Schuit. (2014)
 Taeniophyllum leptorrhizum Schltr. (1913)
 Taeniophyllum leucanthum Schltr. (1913)
 Taeniophyllum leytense Ames (1920)
 Taeniophyllum lobatum Dockrill (1956)
 Taeniophyllum longicaule Kocyan & Schuit. (2014)
 Taeniophyllum longisetigerum J.J.Sm. (1933)
 Taeniophyllum luteum Kocyan & Schuit. (2014)
 Taeniophyllum macranthum Schltr. (1913)
 Taeniophyllum macrorhynchum Schltr. (1913)
 Taeniophyllum macrotaenium Schltr. (1913)
 Taeniophyllum malianum Schltr. (1913)
 Taeniophyllum mamilliferum J.J.Sm. (1921)
 Taeniophyllum mangiferae Schltr. (1913)
 Taeniophyllum manubrioliferum J.J.Sm. (1929)
 Taeniophyllum marianense Schltr. (1914)
 Taeniophyllum maximum J.J.Sm. (1910)
 Taeniophyllum merapiense Schltr. (1911)
 Taeniophyllum merrillii Ames (1911)
 Taeniophyllum micranthum Carr (1932)
 Taeniophyllum minimum Guillaumin (1961)
 Taeniophyllum minusculum Kocyan & Schuit. (2014)
 Taeniophyllum minutiflorum J.J.Sm. (1910)
 Taeniophyllum mirum-labellum Kocyan & Schuit. (2014)
 Taeniophyllum montanum Carr (1932)
 Taeniophyllum muelleri Lindl. ex Benth. (1873)
 Taeniophyllum multiflorum (Ridl.) Kocyan & Schuit. (2014)
 Taeniophyllum muricatum Schltr. (1913)
 Taeniophyllum muriculatum (Schltr.) Kocyan & Schuit. (2014)
 Taeniophyllum musciforme (Schltr.) Kocyan & Schuit. (2014)
 Taeniophyllum neopommeranicum Schltr. in K.M.Schumann & C.A.G.Lauterbach (1905)
 Taeniophyllum neotorricellense Kocyan & Schuit. (2014)
 Taeniophyllum nephrophorum Schltr. (1913)
 Taeniophyllum norfolkianum D.L.Jones, B.Gray & M.A.Clem. (2006)
 Taeniophyllum oblongum Schltr. (1913)
 Taeniophyllum occultans (Schuit. & de Vogel) Kocyan & Schuit. (2014)
 Taeniophyllum orbiculare Schltr. (1913)
 Taeniophyllum oreophilum (Schltr.) Kocyan & Schuit. (2014)
 Taeniophyllum orthorhynchum Schltr. (1913)
 Taeniophyllum ovale Schltr. (1913)
 Taeniophyllum pachyacris Schltr. (1913)
 Taeniophyllum pahangense Carr (1932)
 Taeniophyllum paife Drake (1886)
 Taeniophyllum palawense Schltr. (1921)
 Taeniophyllum pallidiflorum Carr (1932)
 Taeniophyllum pallidum Schltr. (1913)
 Taeniophyllum palmicola Schltr. in K.M.Schumann & C.A.G.Lauterbach (1905)
 Taeniophyllum paludicola Schltr. (1911)
 Taeniophyllum paludosum J.J.Sm. (1908)
 Taeniophyllum pantjarense J.J.Sm. (1927)
 Taeniophyllum papillosum (J.J.Sm.) Kocyan & Schuit. (2014)
 Taeniophyllum papuanum (Schltr.) L.O.Williams (1938)
 Taeniophyllum pectiniferum Schltr. (1913)
 Taeniophyllum petrophilum Schltr. (1921)
 Taeniophyllum phaeanthum Schltr. (1913)
 Taeniophyllum philippinense Rchb.f. (1878)
 Taeniophyllum phitamii Aver. (2015)
 Taeniophyllum physodes Schltr. (1913)
 Taeniophyllum platyrhachis (Schltr.) Kocyan & Schuit. (2014)
 Taeniophyllum platyrhizum Schltr. in K.M.Schumann & C.A.G.Lauterbach (1905)
 Taeniophyllum pleistorhizum Schltr. (1919)
 Taeniophyllum podochiloides (J.J.Sm.) Kocyan & Schuit. (2014)
 Taeniophyllum potamophyllum Schltr. (1911)
 Taeniophyllum proboscideum Schltr.(1913)
 Taeniophyllum proliferum J.J.Sm. (1918)
 Taeniophyllum pterophorum (Schltr.) Kocyan & Schuit. (2014)
 Taeniophyllum pubicarpum Schltr. (1913)
 Taeniophyllum pulvinatum Schltr. in K.M.Schumann & C.A.G.Lauterbach (1905)
 Taeniophyllum pusillum (Willd.) Seidenf. & Ormerod in G.Seidenfaden (1995)
 Taeniophyllum pyriforme Schuit. (2016)
 Taeniophyllum quadratum Schltr. (1913)
 Taeniophyllum quadrilobum Seidenf. (1988)
 Taeniophyllum quaquaversum Schltr. (1913)
 Taeniophyllum radiatum J.J.Sm. (1918)
 Taeniophyllum recurvirostrum J.J.Sm. (1929)
 Taeniophyllum reijnvaanae J.J.Sm. (1920)
 Taeniophyllum retrospiculatum (King & Pantl.) King & Pantl. (1898)
 Taeniophyllum rhodantherum Schltr. (1911)
 Taeniophyllum rhombeum Kocyan & Schuit. (2014)
 Taeniophyllum rhomboglossum Schltr. (1906)
 Taeniophyllum robustum Schltr. (1913)
 Taeniophyllum rostellatum J.J.Sm. (1918)
 Taeniophyllum rostratum Carr (1932)
 Taeniophyllum rubrum Ridl. (1896)
 Taeniophyllum rudolfii Kocyan & Schuit. (2014)
 Taeniophyllum rugulosum Carr (1932)
 Taeniophyllum saccatum L.O.Williams (1938)
 Taeniophyllum samoense (Schltr.) Kocyan & Schuit. (2014)
 Taeniophyllum savaiiense P.J.Cribb & Whistler (1996)
 Taeniophyllum scaberulum Hook.f. (1890)
 Taeniophyllum schlechteri Mansf. (1930)
 Taeniophyllum setipes Schltr. (1919)
 Taeniophyllum singulare J.J.Sm. (1915)
 Taeniophyllum smithii Kores & L.Jonss. (1989)
 Taeniophyllum steenisii (J.J.Sm.) Kocyan & Schuit. (2014)
 Taeniophyllum stella Carr (1932)
 Taeniophyllum stenosepalum Schltr. (1913)
 Taeniophyllum stipulaceum J.J.Sm. (1929)
 Taeniophyllum subtrilobum Schltr. (1913)
 Taeniophyllum sulawesiense Kocyan & Schuit. (2014)
 Taeniophyllum sumatranum Schltr. (1906)
 Taeniophyllum taenioides (P.O'Byrne) Kocyan & Schuit. (2014)
 Taeniophyllum tamianum J.J.Sm. (1914)
 Taeniophyllum tenerrimum J.J.Sm. (1913)
 Taeniophyllum terrestre (J.J.Sm.) Kocyan & Schuit. (2014)
 Taeniophyllum toranum J.J.Sm. (1916)
 Taeniophyllum torricellense Schltr. in K.M.Schumann & C.A.G.Lauterbach (1905)
 Taeniophyllum trachybracteum Schltr. (1912)
 Taeniophyllum trachypus Schltr. (1906)
 Taeniophyllum triangulare J.J.Sm. (1928)
 Taeniophyllum triangulipetalum (J.J.Sm.) Kocyan & Schuit. (2014)
 Taeniophyllum trichopus Schltr. (1913)
 Taeniophyllum trilobum Schltr. (1913)
 Taeniophyllum tripulvinatum J.J.Sm. (1929)
 Taeniophyllum triquetroradix B.Gray (2015)
 Taeniophyllum trukense Fukuy. (1937)
 Taeniophyllum tubulosum (J.J.Sm.) L.O.Williams (1938)
 Taeniophyllum wakatinense J.J.Sm. (1928)
 Taeniophyllum whistleri P.J.Cribb in P.J.Cribb & W.A.Whistler (1996)
 Taeniophyllum xerophilum Schltr. (1913)

References

Taeniophyllum